1199SEIU United Healthcare Workers East is a healthcare union in the United States, with a membership of 400,000 including retirees. It is a local union within the Service Employees International Union. It is a former local of 1199: The National Health Care Workers' Union.

Influence
Patrick Gaspard, a former executive vice president for politics and legislation at the union, was the political director for Barack Obama's presidential campaign. Gaspard was appointed White House Political Director during Obama's first term in office.

In 2016, 1199SEIU's president George Gresham was credited by New York Governor Andrew Cuomo for helping secure the passage of the $15 minimum wage in New York State.

See also

 List of unions designated 1199
 Leon J. Davis
 SEIU

References

(Information on the early history of 1199.)

External links
 

Service Employees International Union